John David Holschuh (October 12, 1926 – January 26, 2011) was a United States district judge of the United States District Court for the Southern District of Ohio.

Education and career

Born in Ironton, Ohio, Holschuh received a Bachelor of Arts degree from Miami University in 1948 and a Juris Doctor from the University of Cincinnati College of Law in 1951. He was in private practice in Columbus, Ohio from 1951 to 1952. He was a law clerk for Judge Mell G. Underwood of the United States District Court for the Northern District of Ohio from 1952 to 1954. He was in private practice in Columbus from 1954 to 1980. He was an adjunct professor of law at the Ohio State University Moritz College of Law from 1970 to 1977.

Federal judicial service

On March 28, 1980, Holschuh was nominated by President Jimmy Carter to a new seat on the United States District Court for the Southern District of Ohio created by 92 Stat. 1629. He was confirmed by the United States Senate on May 21, 1980, and received his commission on May 23, 1980. He served as Chief Judge from 1990 to 1996, assuming senior status on October 12, 1996. He continued hearing cases until just two months before his death on January 26, 2011, in Columbus.

References

Sources
 
 Kathy Lynn Gray, Revered federal judge was a model for others, The Columbus Dispatch (January 27, 2011).

1926 births
Miami University alumni
Judges of the United States District Court for the Southern District of Ohio
United States district court judges appointed by Jimmy Carter
20th-century American judges
2011 deaths
People from Ironton, Ohio
University of Cincinnati College of Law alumni
Ohio State University faculty